The Hato Formation is a geologic formation dating to the Late Pleistocene in Curaçao. It preserves fossils.

See also 

 List of fossiliferous stratigraphic units in Curaçao

References

Further reading 
 J. M. Pandolfi. 2001. Community structure of Pleistocene coral reefs of Curaçao, Netherlands Antilles. Ecological Monographs 71(1):49-67
 J. M. Pandolfi, G. Llewellyn, and J. B. C. Jackson. 1999. Pleistocene reef environments, constituent grains, and coral community structure: Curaçao, Netherlands Antilles. Coral Reefs 18:107-122

Geologic formations of the Caribbean
Geology of Curaçao
Paleontology in Curaçao
Pleistocene Caribbean
Limestone formations
Reef deposits